Parthenina monozona is a species of sea snail, a marine gastropod mollusk in the family Pyramidellidae, the pyrams and their allies.

Distribution
This marine species occurs in the following locations:
 European waters (ERMS scope)
 Greek Exclusive Economic Zone
 Italy
 Mediterranean Sea
 Portuguese Exclusive Economic Zone
 Spanish Exclusive Economic Zone
 United Kingdom Exclusive Economic Zone

Notes
Additional information regarding this species:
 Habitat: Known from rocky shores.

References

 Giannuzzi-Savelli R., Pusateri F., Micali, P., Nofroni, I., Bartolini S. (2014). Atlante delle conchiglie marine del Mediterraneo, vol. 5 (Heterobranchia). Edizioni Danaus, Palermo, pp. 1– 111 with 41 unnumbered plates (figs. 1-363), appendix pp. 1–91 page(s): 163, appendix p. 19
 Riccardo Giannuzzi Savelli, On Parthenina monozona (Brusina, 1869) and its variability (Gastropoda Heterobranchia Pyramidellidae); Biodiversity Journal , 2015, 6 (2): 521–528

External links
 To CLEMAM
 To Encyclopedia of Life
 To World Register of Marine Species

Pyramidellidae
Gastropods described in 1869